The 2004 United States Senate election in Illinois was held on November 2, 2004. Incumbent Republican U.S. Senator Peter Fitzgerald decided to retire after one term. The Democratic and Republican primary elections were held in March, which included a total of 15 candidates who combined to spend a record total of over $60 million seeking the open seat.

On March 16, 2004, State Senator Barack Obama won the Democratic primary, and businessman Jack Ryan won the Republican primary. Three months later, Ryan announced his withdrawal from the race four days after the Chicago Tribune persuaded a California court to release records from Ryan's custody case, which included allegations that Ryan had pressured his then-wife actress Jeri Ryan to perform sexual acts in public.

Six weeks later, the Illinois Republican State Central Committee chose former Diplomat Alan Keyes to replace Ryan as the Republican candidate. Keyes had previously lost two races for the U.S. Senate in Maryland in 1988 and 1992, both by large margins. The election was the first in U.S. Senate history in which both major-party candidates were black. According to Obama's 2020 memoir A Promised Land he had promised Michelle Obama that if he had lost the race he would retire from politics.

Obama won the election with 70% of the vote and a margin of 43% over Keyes, the largest margin of victory for a U.S. Senate candidate in Illinois history and significantly larger than Democrat John Kerry's 10.3% margin in the concurrent presidential election. Obama carried 92 of the state's 102 counties, including several where Democrats traditionally had not done well. The inequality in the candidates spending for the fall elections – $14,244,768 by Obama and $2,545,325 by Keyes – is also among the largest in history in both absolute and relative terms. Obama served in the Senate for four years until he was elected president in 2008.

Election information
The primaries and general elections coincided with those for federal offices (president and House), as well as those for state offices.

Turnout

For the primary elections, turnout was 26.69%, with 1,904,800 votes cast. For the general election, turnout was 68.56%, with 5,141,520 votes cast.

Republican primary

Candidates 
 John L. Borling, Air Force veteran
 Norm Hill, Army veteran
 Chirinjeev Kathuria, businessman
 Andrew McKenna, businessman
 Jim Oberweis, businessman
 Steve Rauschenberger, State Senator
 Jack Ryan, businessman
 Jonathan C. Wright, former  State Representative

Campaign 
In this campaign, Chirinjeev Kathuria became the first Indian-American and first person of the Sikh religion to run for a United States Senate seat.

GOP frontrunner Jack Ryan had divorced actress Jeri Ryan in 1999, and the records of the divorce were sealed at their mutual request. Five years later, when Ryan's Senate campaign began, the Chicago Tribune newspaper and WLS-TV, the local ABC affiliate, sought to have the records released.  On March 3, 2004, several of Ryan's GOP primary opponents urged Ryan to release the records.  Both Ryan and his wife agreed to make their divorce records public, but not make the child custody records public, claiming that the custody records could be harmful to their son if released.  Ryan went on to win the GOP primary on March 16, 2004 defeating his nearest competitor, Jim Oberweis, by twelve percentage points.

Ryan was a proponent of across-the-board tax cuts and tort reform, an effort to limit payout in medical malpractice lawsuits. He was also a proponent of school choice and supported vouchers for private school students.

Oberweis's 2004 campaign was notable for a television commercial where he flew in a helicopter over Chicago's Soldier Field, and claimed enough illegal immigrants came into America in a week (10,000 a day) to fill the stadium's 61,500 seats. Oberweis was also fined $21,000 by the Federal Election Commission for a commercial for his dairy that ran during his 2004 Senate campaign. The FEC ruled that the commercial wrongly benefited his campaign and constituted a corporate contribution, thus violating campaign law.

Results

Democratic primary

Candidates

Declared 
 Gery Chico, former President of the Chicago Board of Education
 Blair Hull, businessman
 Daniel Hynes, State Comptroller
 Barack Obama, State Senator and candidate for IL-01 in 2000
 Maria Pappas, Cook County Treasurer
 Nancy Skinner, radio personality
 Joyce Washington, health care executive
 Estella Johnson Hunt (write-in)

Withdrew 
 Matt O'Shea, Mayor of Metamora, Illinois. He withdrew December 1, 2003 due to poor polling numbers. He endorsed Gery Chico.

Source:

Campaign 

Fitzgerald's predecessor, Democrat Carol Moseley Braun, declined to run. Barack Obama, a member of the Illinois Senate since 1997 and an unsuccessful 2000 Democratic primary challenger to four-term incumbent U.S. Rep. Bobby Rush for Rush's U.S House seat, launched a campaign committee at the beginning of July 2002 to run for the U.S. Senate, 21 months before the March 2004 primary, and two months later had David Axelrod lined up to do his campaign media. Obama formally announced his candidacy on January 21, 2003, four days after former U.S. Sen. Carol Moseley Braun announced she would not seek a rematch with U.S. Sen. Peter Fitzgerald.

On April 15, 2003, with six Democrats already running and three Republicans threatening to run against him, incumbent Fitzgerald announced he would not seek a second term in 2004, and three weeks later popular Republican former Governor Jim Edgar declined to run, leading to wide open Democratic and Republican primary races with 15 candidates, including 7 millionaires (triggering the first application of the Millionaires' Amendment of the 2002 McCain–Feingold Act), in the most expensive Senate primary in U.S. history.

Obama touted his legislative experience and early public opposition to the Iraq War to distinguish himself from his Democratic primary rivals. Illinois Comptroller Dan Hynes won the endorsement of the AFL–CIO. Obama succeeded in obtaining the support of three of the state's largest and most active member unions: AFSCME, SEIU, and the Illinois Federation of Teachers. Hynes and multimillionaire former securities trader Blair Hull each won the endorsements of two of the nine Democratic Illinois members of the US House of Representatives. Obama had the endorsements of four: Jesse Jackson, Jr., Danny Davis, Lane Evans, and Jan Schakowsky.

Obama surged into the lead after he finally began television advertising in Chicago in the final three weeks of the campaign, which was expanded to downstate Illinois during the last six days of the campaign. The ads included strong endorsements by the five largest newspapers in Illinois—the Chicago Tribune, Chicago Sun-Times, Daily Herald, The Rockford Register Star, and Peoria Journal Star—and a testimonial by Sheila Simon that Obama was "cut from that same cloth" as her father, the late former U.S. Senator Paul Simon, who had planned to endorse and campaign for Obama before his unexpected death in December 2003.

Results 

On March 16, 2004, Obama won the Democratic primary by an unexpected landslide—receiving 53% of the vote, 29% ahead of his nearest Democratic rival, with a vote total that nearly equaled that of all eight Republican candidates combined—which overnight made him a rising star in the national Democratic Party, started speculation about a presidential future, and led to the reissue of his memoir, Dreams from My Father. The Democratic primary election, including seven candidates who combined to spend over $46 million, was the most expensive U.S. Senate primary election in history.

General election

Obama vs. Ryan 
As a result of the GOP and Democratic primaries, Democrat Barack Obama was pitted against Republican Jack Ryan.

Ryan trailed Obama in early polls, after the media reported that Ryan had assigned Justin Warfel, a Ryan campaign worker, to track Obama's appearances. The tactic backfired when many people, including Ryan's supporters, criticized this activity.  Ryan's spokesman apologized, and promised that Warfel would give Obama more space.  Obama acknowledged that it is standard practice to film an opponent in public, and Obama said he was satisfied with Ryan's decision to have Warfel back off.

As the campaign progressed, the lawsuit brought by the Chicago Tribune to open child custody files from Ryan's divorce was still continuing. Barack Obama's backers emailed reporters about the divorce controversy, but refrained from on-the-record commentary. On March 29, 2004, Los Angeles Superior Court Judge Robert Schnider ruled that several of the Ryans' divorce records should be opened to the public, and ruled that a court-appointed referee would later decide which custody files should remain sealed to protect the interests of Ryan's young child. A few days later, on April 2, 2004, Barack Obama changed his position about the Ryans' soon-to-be-released divorce records, and called on Democrats to not inject them into the campaign.

On June 22, 2004, after receiving the report from the court appointed referee, the judge released the files that were deemed consistent with the interests of Ryan's young child. In those files, Jeri Ryan alleged that Jack Ryan had taken her to sex clubs in several cities, intending for them to have sex in public.

The decision to release the files generated much controversy because it went against both parents' direct request, and because it reversed the earlier decision to seal the papers in the best interest of the child. Jim Oberweis, Ryan's defeated GOP opponent, commented that "these are allegations made in a divorce hearing, and we all know people tend to say things that aren't necessarily true in divorce proceedings when there is money involved and custody of children involved."

Although their sensational nature made the revelations fodder for tabloid and television programs specializing in such stories, the files were also newsworthy because of questions about whether Ryan had accurately described the documents to GOP party leaders.  Prior to release of the documents, Ryan had told leading Republicans that five percent of the divorce file could cause problems for his campaign. But after the documents were released, GOP officials including state GOP Chair Judy Baar Topinka said they felt Ryan had misleadingly indicated the divorce records would not be embarrassing.

That charge of dishonesty led to intensifying calls for Ryan's withdrawal, though Topinka, who was considering running herself, said after the June 25 withdrawal that Ryan's "decision was a personal one" and that the state GOP had not pressured Ryan to drop out.  Ryan's campaign ended less than a week after the custody records were opened, and Ryan officially filed the documentation to withdraw on July 29, 2004.  Obama was left without an opponent.

Obama vs. Keyes 
The Illinois Republican State Central Committee chose former diplomat Alan Keyes to replace Ryan as the Republican candidate after former governor Jim Edgar, Topinka, and former Chicago Bears head coach Mike Ditka declined to run. Keyes, a conservative Republican, faced an uphill battle. First, as a native of Maryland, he had almost no ties to Illinois. Second, he had an unsuccessful electoral track record, losing two races for U.S. Senate in Maryland by landslides and making unsuccessful bids for the Republican presidential nomination in 1996 and 2000. Third, Keyes's lack of electoral momentum enabled Obama to focus on campaigning in more conservative downstate regions, an unusual move for an Illinois Democrat.

Media were angered by what they considered Keyes's parachute candidacy. The Chicago Tribune published a scathing editorial, calling him "[t]he GOP's rent-a-senator" and sarcastically listing basic facts about local geography for a candidate they suspected had no familiarity with the area: "Keyes may have noticed a large body of water as he flew into O'Hare. That is called Lake Michigan. It's large. It's wide. It's deep. And we'll spoil the surprise: You can't even see across it." In a similar vein, The New York Times published an editorial decrying "the rank hypocrisy", recalling that four years earlier, Keyes had attacked Hillary Clinton for establishing residency in New York for the first time only two months before announcing her U.S. Senate candidacy in that state. Keyes attacked Barack Obama for voting against a bill that would have outlawed a form of late-term abortion.

Race became an issue in the contest between the two black candidates when Keyes claimed that he, not Obama, was the true "African-American".  Indeed there were a handful of black spokesmen who did not consider Obama to be African-American.  The black voters of Illinois voted 92% for Obama.

Obama ran the most successful Senate campaign in 2004, and was so far ahead in polls that he soon began to campaign outside of Illinois in support of other Democratic candidates. He gave large sums of campaign funds to other candidates and the Democratic Senatorial Campaign Committee and sent many of his volunteers to work on other races, including that of eventual three-term Congresswoman Melissa Bean who defeated then-Congressman Phil Crane in that year's election. Obama and Keyes differed on many issues including school vouchers and tax cuts, both of which Keyes supported and Obama opposed.

Predictions

Polling

Results 

The Obama-Keyes race was one of the first to be called on Election Day, November 2, 2004.

At the start of Keyes' candidacy in August, Keyes had 24% support in the polls. He received 27% of the vote in the November general election to Obama's 70%.

Following the election, Keyes refused to call Obama to congratulate him. Media reports claimed that Keyes also failed to concede the race to Obama. Two days after the election, a radio interviewer asked Keyes whether he had conceded the race. Keyes replied, "Of course I've conceded the race. I mean, I gave my speech to that effect."

On the radio program, Keyes explained that his refusal to congratulate Obama was "not anything personal," but was meant to make a statement against "extend[ing] false congratulations to the triumph of what we have declared to be across the line." He said that Obama's position on moral issues regarding life and the family had crossed that line. "I'm supposed to make a call that represents the congratulations toward the triumph of that which I believe ultimately stands for... a culture evil enough to destroy the very soul and heart of my country? I can't do this. And I will not make a false gesture," Keyes said.

Obama would go on to be elected President of the United States in 2008.

See also 
 2004 United States Senate elections

Notes

References

Further reading 
 
 

2004 Illinois elections
2004
Illinois
Barack Obama